Gowala or Ghosh (also spelled as Goala) is a subcaste of Ahir/Yadav community,  found from Indian state of Assam, Tripura and Himachal Pradesh and the neighbouring states of Arunachal Pradesh, Punjab and Chandigarh. Traditionally they are herdsman or milkman and considered as a prosperous community.

Origin
The Gowalas are closely associated with Krishna and believed to descent from Raja Yadu, which Krishna was born. By 1910s they became the part of Yadav community as part of Sanskritisation.

References

Indian castes
Social groups of Assam
Ahir
Social groups of Himachal Pradesh

Social groups of Punjab, India